The 2006 Tour Down Under was held from 18 to 22 January 2006 in and around Adelaide, South Australia. It was a multiple stage road cycling race that took part over five stages with a total of 685 kilometres and is part of the 2005–06 UCI Oceania Tour. The 2006 Down Under Classic was the official warm-up race for the event. The event was awarded the Australian Sport Tourism Award of the year at the Australian Sport Awards in February 2006, having attracted 495,000 spectators and more than 11,670 visitors to South Australia.

Men's stage summary

Other leading top threes

Men's top 10 overall

Women's stage summary

References

 Official website
 Cyclingnews.com Tour Down Under 2006 site

2006
Tour Down Under
Tour Down Under
2006 in Oceanian sport
January 2006 sports events in Australia